Chris Speyer (born 24 March 1941) is a former Progressive Conservative party member of the House of Commons of Canada. He was a criminal lawyer by career.

Speyer was born in Toronto, Ontario, Canada.  He represented the Ontario riding of Cambridge where he was first elected in 1979. Speyer was re-elected in 1980 and 1984, serving successive terms from the 31st to the 33rd Canadian Parliaments.

Speyer left national politics in 1988 and did not campaign in that year's federal election. He served as a judge of the Ontario Superior Court of Justice in Toronto until 2017.

Electoral record

References

External links
 

1941 births
Living people
Members of the House of Commons of Canada from Ontario
Politicians from Toronto
Progressive Conservative Party of Canada MPs